Dilek Sabancı Sport Hall was an indoor sporting arena located in Antalya, Turkey. Owned by the Sabancı Foundation, it was opened on November 3, 2001.

The capacity of the arena was 2,500 spectators.  It was the home of Turkish Basketball League clubs, Antalya Büyükşehir Belediyesi and Kepez Belediyespor. The arena was demolished in June 2013 due to construction of New Antalya Stadium, and replaced by a new arena originally being built for the 2010 FIBA World Championship, Antalya Arena.

International events hosted
 13th European Wushu Championships, March 6–13, 2010

References

External links
 Venue information

Indoor arenas in Turkey
Sports venues in Antalya
Basketball venues in Turkey
Sports venues completed in 2001
Turkish Basketball League venues
Sabancı family
2001 establishments in Turkey
Sports venues demolished in 2013
2013 disestablishments in Turkey
Demolished buildings and structures in Turkey